Rachida Brakni (born 15 February 1977) is a French actress and producer. She is married to actor and former professional footballer Éric Cantona.<ref> , Nouvel Observateur, 17 June 2007</ref>

Biography
In 2001, she joined the Comédie Française, as a member of which she won a Molière Award for her performance in Ruy Blas. In 2002, she was awarded the César Award for Most Promising Actress for her performance in Chaos.

In 2010, she directed her husband, Éric Cantona, in Face au paradis (In Front of Paradise), a contemporary play, written by a young French playwright, Nathalie Saugeon. The production opened at Théâtre Marigny on the Champs-Élysées on 26 January 2010.

In 2012, she joined her husband Cantona as the face of the fashion brand The Kooples in an advertising campaign.

Selected filmographyChaos (2001)Loin (2001)The Overeater (L'Outremangeur) (2003)Portrait caché (2003)Ne Quittez pas ! (2004)Mon Accident (2004)L'Enfant endormi (2005)Une Belle histoire (2005)Barakat ! (2006)La Surprise (TV) (2006)On ne devrait pas exister (2006)La Part animale (2007)Lisa et le pilote d'avion (2007)A Man and His Dog (2009)Neuilly sa mère ! (2009)Face au paradis (2010)La Ligne droite (2011)Let Them Come (2015)Neuilly sa mère, sa mère !'' (2018)

References

External links

 

1977 births
Living people
French film actresses
Actresses from Paris
French people of Algerian descent
21st-century French actresses
French National Academy of Dramatic Arts alumni
Most Promising Actress Lumières Award winners
20th-century French actresses
French stage actresses
Most Promising Actress César Award winners